William Griswold may refer to:

 Bill Griswold, professor of computer science and engineering
 William Griswold (museum director), museum director and curator
 William A. Griswold (1775–1846), Vermont politician and attorney
 William M. Griswold (1823–1889), Wisconsin politician